Eurystylus bellevoyei is a species of true bug in the family Miridae with a wide distribution in the Old World. It feeds primarily on Chenopodiaceae plants. It is a serious pest of sorghum in Africa and India.

References

Miridae
Insect pests of millets